Oakford (Welsh Derwen Gam) is a hamlet in the Welsh county of Ceredigion.

External links 
www.geograph.co.uk : photos of Oakford and surrounding area

Villages in Ceredigion